Jean-René Fourtou (born 1939) is a French business executive. He served as the chief executive officer and chairman of Vivendi from 2002 to 2005. He now serves as its honorary chairman.

References

Living people
1939 births
People from Libourne
École Polytechnique alumni
French chief executives
Commandeurs of the Légion d'honneur